Alampur Assembly constituency is a constituency of Telangana Legislative Assembly, India. It is one of 14 constituencies in Mahbubnagar district. It is part of Nagarkurnool Lok Sabha constituency.

V. M. Abraham of Telangana Rashtra Samithi has been representing the constituency since 2018.

Mandals
The current Assembly Constituency comprises the following Mandals:

Members of Legislative Assembly

Election results

Telangana Legislative Assembly election, 2018

Telangana Legislative Assembly election, 2014

Assembly elections 1952

See also
 List of constituencies of Telangana Legislative Assembly

References

Assembly constituencies of Telangana
Mahbubnagar district